The Institute of Human Virology Nigeria (IHVN) is a non-governmental organization that focuses on HIV/AIDS related problems in Nigeria.  It was established as an affiliate to the Institute of Human Virology, University of Maryland School of Medicine, Baltimore in 2004. In 2016, IHVN claimed that it reaches 2.3 million Nigerians with HIV testing services, including about 25,000 who tested positive for the disease.


Major programs
Programs at IHVN include:
 HIV Services
 Tuberculosis/Drug Resistant TB Intervention
 Malaria Program
 Cancer Registration/Research
 Training Activities

Funding
The activities of the Institute are funded by international organizations which include:
 Centers for Disease Control and Prevention (CDC)
 The Global Fund to fight AIDS, Tuberculosis and Malaria (GF) 
 University of Maryland, Baltimore USA (UMB)
 United States' National Institute for Health (NIH)
 International Development Research Center (IDRC)
 World Health Organization (WHO)

References

Medical and health organizations based in Nigeria
HIV/AIDS